The men's 56 kg weightlifting competitions at the 1960 Summer Olympics in Rome took place on 7 September at the Palazzetto dello Sport. It was the fourth appearance of the bantamweight class.

Results

References

Weightlifting at the 1960 Summer Olympics